Pesach or Pesakh ( PSḤ) was a Khazar Jewish general mentioned in the Schechter Letter. Pesach was military commander of the region around the Strait of Kerch who defeated the armies of the Rus' prince HLGW, most likely Oleg of Novgorod, around the year 941 in the Taman region.

Golb and Pritsak argue that the term PSḤ should be read as "the Beg" or "Ebe-shad".

The letter associates Pesach with the term BWLŠṢY with the phrase , or, "BWLŠṢY who is Pesach haMYQR". This has given rise to two interpretations: that BWLŠṢY represents the Khazar military title baliqchi, which is only attested to by the Greek accounts of Theophanes the Confessor - thus affording the reading "Pesach, he (who is the) baliqchi" - or, that BWLŠṢY represents a personal name, perhaps the Turkic Boluščï, indicating that "Pesach" was merely the general's nickname, or at the very least was not his name at birth - thus affording the reading  "Boluščï, he (who is called) Pesach". Assuming BWLŠṢY does represent the title of baliqchi, it might indicate that Pesach commanded ships or a port, instead of soldiers on the ground, as baliqchi is thought to roughly translate to "Fisherman" (or, in alternate translation "Fish-Lord") in the Khazar language; leading scholars to hypothesize that the office was actually a naval rank within the Khazar military.

The term haMYQR is similarly obscure. Schechter proposed reading "the Reverer" or emending to המיחד haMYḤD "the Uniter". David Kahane proposed the alternate reading השומר haŠMR "the guardian". Golb and Pritsak agree with המיקר but read המיוקר haMeyuqqar "the Honored".

References

Sources
Kevin Alan Brook. The Jews of Khazaria. 2nd ed. Rowman & Littlefield Publishers, Inc, 2006.
Dunlop, Douglas M. The History of the Jewish Khazars, Princeton, N.J.: Princeton University Press, 1954.
Golb, Norman and Omeljan Pritsak. Khazarian Hebrew Documents of the Tenth Century. Ithaca: Cornell Univ. Press, 1982.
Zuckerman, Constantine. "On the Date of the Khazar’s Conversion to Judaism and the Chronology of the Kings of the Rus Oleg and Igor." Revue des Etudes Byzantines 53 (1995): 237–270.

Khazar generals
10th-century Jews